Ravil Akhmedullovich Isyanov (20 August 1962 – 29 September 2021) was a Russian actor who appeared in over 70 film and television roles, primarily in the United States. He was most well known for his role as Anatoli Kirkin on NCIS: Los Angeles.

Biography
Isyanov was born in Voskresensk (Moscow Oblast) on 20 August 1962, and served in the Soviet Air Force for two years. He worked for two seasons at a regional theatre in Khabarovsk, before enrolling in the MKhAT Studio-School in Moscow, under Alexander Kalyagin, graduating in 1990. He also studied three summers overseas at the British American Drama Academy's "Midsummer at Oxford" program in England. He began his professional career as an ensemble member of the Theatr Clwyd in Wales.

After the collapse of the Soviet Union, he decided to stay in Britain on his work visa, and continued working there. He made notable film appearances in the Nicolas Roeg-directed Two Deaths and the James Bond film GoldenEye, both in 1995. He had a supporting role as Cornelius in Kenneth Branagh's epic adaptation of Hamlet, released the following year.

In 1998, Isyanov moved to Los Angeles, where he lived and worked until his death. Isyanov died on 29 September 2021, at the age of 59, following a 17-month battle with cancer.

Filmography

Film

Television

References

External links 
 
 Ravil Isyanov on kinoteatr.ru
 Ravil Isyanov on KinoPoisk

1962 births
2021 deaths
20th-century American male actors
20th-century Russian male actors
21st-century Russian male actors
Male actors from Moscow
People from Voskresensk
Russian emigrants to the United States
Russian expatriates in the United Kingdom
Russian male film actors
Russian male television actors